is a Japanese semiconductor and electronics company, headquartered in Kyoto, engaged in the manufacture and sale of equipment for the manufacturing of semiconductors, flat panel displays, storage media (such as optical discs) and precision technology manufacturing equipment.

Dainippon Screen has several sites in Japan, with offices in Kyoto, Kudanminami, Chiyoda, Tokyo, Etchūjima, Koto, Tokyo and manufacturing plants in Kyoto, Yasu, Shiga, Hikone, and Taga, Shiga,

Dainippon Screen Group has many subsidiaries in Japan, the United States, the UK, Germany, the Netherlands, China, Hong Kong, South Korea, Taiwan, Singapore and Australia.

On August 5, 2014, Dainippon Screen announced a change of its corporate name to Screen Holdings, as it restructured to become a holding company.

Korea's largest semiconductor manufacturer SEMES Co. Ltd. was made as a joint venture with Dainippon Screen using the latter's technology. Currently they have no capital relationship but SEMES continues to use technology from Dainippon Screen and gets all its revenue with orders from Samsung's cleaning equipment.

See also 

 Screen Station

References

External links
 

Electronics companies of Japan
Manufacturing companies based in Kyoto
Companies listed on the Tokyo Stock Exchange
Electronics companies established in 1943
Japanese brands
Japanese companies established in 1943
Equipment semiconductor companies